Bamê is a village in Foshan Township, Dêqên County, Dêqên Tibetan Autonomous Prefecture in northwest Yunnan province, China, along the border with the Tibet Autonomous Region. It is part of Foshan Township (佛山乡),
The village is located above and adjacent to the valley of the Lancang (Mekong) River and China National Highway 214 passes near it.

See also
 List of villages in China

References

Dêqên County
Villages in Yunnan